Dash Khaneh (also Romanized as Dāsh Khāneh and Dāshkhāneh) is a village in Tabas Rural District, in the Central District of Khoshab County, Razavi Khorasan Province, Iran. At the 2006 census, its population was 416, in 126 families.

References 

Populated places in Khoshab County